J-League Winning Eleven 2008 Club Championship is the latest edition to the Winning Eleven J-League series. This game is an update to the J-League Winning Eleven 2007 Club Championship and the game was only released in Japan. The game only features club teams and include all teams from J-League.

2008 video games
J.League licensed video games
Japan-exclusive video games
PlayStation 2 games
PlayStation 2-only games
Pro Evolution Soccer
Video games developed in Japan